Caplansky's Delicatessen is a delicatessen in Toronto, Ontario, Canada. It originated in 2007 in a room in the Monarch Tavern on Clinton Street which Zane Caplansky rented as a venue to make and sell house-cured hand-cut smoked meat sandwiches and knishes. The venture was successful and in 2009, Caplansky opened his eponymous full service delicatessen located at 356 College Street near Kensington Market. Caplansky's opened a food truck, named "Thunderin' Thelma", in 2011, which travelled to various events and locations in the city to sell food on the street.

In 2013, Caplansky's launched a line of mustards in grocery stores and specialty shops across Ontario, Quebec, and Nova Scotia.

Caplansky's received worldwide publicity the next year when it sponsored the Toronto Palestine Film Festival.

In August 2014, Caplansky's opened a franchise at Pearson International Airport.  Another location opened in Toronto's Yorkville area.

In 2016, Caplansky's sued its College Street landlord after the landlord padlocked the premises after declaring the Caplansky's lease to be terminated due to a dispute over repairs. A month later, the Ontario Superior Court validated the lease and returned "exclusive possession" of the premises to Caplansky's, ordering the landlord to allow Caplansky's to resume operations. 

On January 3, 2018, Zane Caplansky announced the closure of the College location stating that business had never recovered from the 2016 interruption of business. Caplansky's also faced mounting legal costs due to continuing disputes with the landlord. Caplansky's Yorkville location closed suddenly on January 31, 2018 after, frustrated by only breaking even, Caplansky's partner in the Yorkville location bought out the lease and terminated it.

Since its College location's closure, the store was renovated and has become the flagship store for a world famous Japanese confectionery store by the name of LeTAO who sells cheesecakes, chocolates, and cookies all flown in from Hokkaido, Japan. LeTAO with its tagline of "Nostalgic Modern" transformed the space, refinishing the century old Italian Terrazzo floors and refurbishing the Toronto famous brick walls. LeTAO has since closed as well. 

The airport location, which is owned by HMSHost and licences the Caplansky's name, remains in operation, while the food truck is no longer operating and has been sold.

In 2019, Caplansky's launched a food stand at the Rogers Centre and re-launched a line of mustards, selling them online.

See also

 List of Ashkenazi Jewish restaurants
 List of delicatessens

References

External links
Caplansky's Deli

Ashkenazi Jewish culture in Toronto
Ashkenazi Jewish restaurants
Jewish delicatessens in Canada
Toronto cuisine
Restaurants in Toronto
Tourist attractions in Toronto
Restaurants established in 2009
Jewish Canadian cuisine
Jews and Judaism in Toronto
Kensington Market